Air Alliance was an airline based in Quebec, Canada, which was operational from its formation in 1987 until 1999, when it was absorbed into Air Nova. The brand name Alliance was then used by Air Canada until 2011 to refer to its eastern Tier III operation operated by Air Georgian.

Fleet
 18 De Havilland Canada Dash 8
 12 Raytheon 1900D

See also 
 List of defunct airlines of Canada

References

Air Canada
Defunct airlines of Canada
Airlines established in 1988
Airlines disestablished in 1999
Former Star Alliance affiliate members
Companies based in Quebec City